Dieter Reiter (born 19 May 1958) is a German politician and the mayor of Munich, the capital of the state of Bavaria. He is a member of the Social Democratic Party.

Career
Reiter was born in Rain, Swabia. He studied at the Fachhochschule für öffentliche Verwaltung und Rechtspflege in Hof, where he finished 1981. On the 30. March 2014 he was voted with 56.7% of votes mayor of Munich. He succeeded Christian Ude, who served as mayor from 1993 to 2014. Reiter was a SPD delegate to the Federal Convention for the purpose of electing the President of Germany in 2017.

In 2021, Reiter proposed illuminating the stadium for UEFA Euro 2020 in rainbow colors to protest the Hungarian anti-LGBT law, but this was rejected by UEFA.

Other activities

Corporate boards
 FC Bayern, member of the advisory board 
 Stadtwerke München (SWM), ex officio chairman of the supervisory board
 Munich Airport, ex officio member of the supervisory board
 Messe München, ex officio member of the supervisory board

Non-profit organizations
 Ludwig Maximilian University of Munich, member of the board of trustees
 Technische Universität München, member of the board of trustees
 Deutsches Museum, member of the board of trustees
 Ifo Institute for Economic Research, member of the board of trustees
 ver.di, member

Personal life
Reiter has been married twice, and is the father of a son from his first marriage. His second wife, Petra, has two children of her own from a previous relationship.

References 

1958 births
Living people
Mayors of Munich
Social Democratic Party of Germany politicians
People from Rain, Swabia